Alexandra was an electoral ward in Penarth, Vale of Glamorgan, Wales. It elected county councillors to the Vale of Glamorgan Council at the 1995 and 1999 local elections.

The Alexandra ward covered a large area of Penarth including the town centre and the more affluent southern part. Five county councillors were elected from the ward to the Vale of Glamorgan Council. For elections to Penarth Town Council it was divided into the Plymouth and St Augustine's community wards.

1983–1996
The ward elected councillors to the Vale of Glamorgan Borough Council from 1983. Five Conservative councillors were elected at the 1983, 1987 and 1991 elections.

* existing councillor, standing for re-election

Post-1996
At the 1995 county elections to the new Vale of Glamorgan Council unitary authority, Alexandra elected five Labour Party councillors, in what the South Wales Echo described as a "rout". There were no Conservative councillors left in Penarth.

o existing councillor, elected in 1991 to the VoG borough council, standing for re-election

At the following 1999 elections, four of the five seats were won back by the Conservative Party.

Following The County Borough of The Vale of Glamorgan (Electoral Changes) Order 2002 Alexandra was divided into two, with the existing town wards of Plymouth and St Augustine's becoming county wards electing two councillors each to the county council. The change was effective from October 2003 for preliminary electoral proceedings but fully effective at the May 2004 Vale of Glamorgan Council elections.

In 2017 town councillors asked South Wales Police why they were still using the Alexandra ward as an area of Penarth for their crime statistics. The police blamed this on an overseas software update.

References

Former wards of Wales
Penarth
Vale of Glamorgan electoral wards
2004 disestablishments in Wales